The 2010–11 Baylor Bears basketball team represented Baylor University in the 2010–11 NCAA Division I men's basketball season. This was head coach Scott Drew's eighth season at Baylor. The Bears compete in the Big 12 Conference and played their home games at the Ferrell Center.

Roster
Source

 J'mison Morgan left UCLA after having been dismissed from the team near the end of the 2009–10 season. He enrolled at Baylor in summer 2010 to be closer to his ill grandmother, who was his legal guardian. The NCAA granted him a waiver from its normal transfer rules that allowed him to play immediately at Baylor.

Schedule and results
Source
All times are Central

|-
!colspan=9| Exhibition

|-
!colspan=9| Regular Season

 

 

 

    

|-
! colspan=9|2011 Big 12 men's basketball tournament

References

Baylor
Baylor Bears men's basketball seasons